The Women's  relay athletics events for the 2012 Summer Paralympics took place at the London Olympic Stadium on 4 September. A total of one event was contested over this distance with each leg being run by one of the four different classifications, T35, T36, T37 and T38.

Results

T35/T38

References

Athletics at the 2012 Summer Paralympics
2012 in women's athletics
Women's sport in London